The Western moose (Alces alces andersoni) is a subspecies of moose that inhabits boreal forests and mixed deciduous forests in the Canadian Arctic, western Canadian provinces and a few western sections of the northern United States and it was introduced to New Zealand. It is the second largest North American subspecies of moose, second to the Alaskan moose. This subspecies is prey to timber wolves, bears. Male Western moose are aggressive during mating season (autumn and winter) and may injure or kill with provocation.

Habitat, range, and distribution
The Western moose inhabits British Columbia, eastern Yukon, Northwest Territories, southwestern Nunavut, Alberta, Saskatchewan, Manitoba, western Ontario, the upper peninsula of Michigan, northern Wisconsin, northern Minnesota, and northeastern North Dakota. 
Additionally, Parks Canada transferred eighteen western moose from Elk Island National Park to Nova Scotia's Cape Breton Highlands National Park between 1947 and 1949 for population increase. Cape Breton Island's moose are descendants of these western moose.

 They were also introduced to New Zealand's Fiordland National Park.

Diet
Western moose eat terrestrial vegetation such as forbs and shoots from willow and birch trees and aquatic plants, including lilies and pondweed. The Western moose, like other species, lacks upper front teeth but instead has eight sharp incisors on its lower jaw. They also have a tough tongue, gums, and lips to help chew woody vegetation.

Size and weight

Social structure and reproduction

Western moose do not form social bonds and only come into contact to mate or to battle for a mate. Elevated testosterone levels during mating season mean that bulls may attack anything during mating season, including humans, coyotes, wild boars, deer, red foxes, cougars, wolf packs, Grizzly bears, elk, and black bears. They use a subtle mating call to attract females or to announce to other males that they are in the area. In the event of a fight over mating rights, bull moose risk locking their antlers, which almost always results in them both dying from starvation. Western moose females will have, on average, one or two calves at once. A female may attack if she feels that her calves are threatened, although, at around 10–11 months yearling Western moose are chased off by their mothers to fend for themselves.

Hunting
With a population of about 950,000 individuals, they are hunted every autumn and winter in both Canada and the United States. Annual quotas vary depending on local population estimates and hunter success from the previous season.

References

Moose
Mammals of the United States
Mammals of Canada
Fauna of the Great Lakes region (North America)
Fauna of the Northwestern United States
Fauna of Western Canada
Cape Breton Island